Opsarius maculatus is a fish in the genus Opsarius of the family Cyprinidae. It is endemic to India and can reach  SL.

References 

Freshwater fish of India
Opsarius
Fish described in 1839